William Brookfield may refer to:
 William Henry Brookfield (1809–1874), Anglican priest
 William Brookfield (politician) (1844–1903), American businessman and politician from New York